Lake Leonard is a small freshwater crater lake in Mount Leonard (also known as Leonard Kniaseff), an andesitic-to-dacitic stratovolcano complex in the Leonard Mountain Range which is located  northeast of Davao City in the province of Davao de Oro in the Philippines.

Origin
Volcanic activity began 1.1 million years ago in the area and a series of lava domes in the region surrounding the lake were created in about 290,000 years ago. One of the biggest of these domes collapsed leaving a caldera that in time filled with water and transformed into a freshwater lake capable of sustaining life. Solfataras (fumaroles that emits sulfuric gases) occurring on its southwest rim is evident that under this lake is a sleeping active volcano. Active solfataras, fumaroles, and hot springs are also found in the Amacan-Gopod thermal area south of the lake. The Manat thermal area is located north of Lake Leonard.

Disturbances and threats
The edge of the lake is badly silted as a result of human activities on the upper slopes of the watershed, particularly road construction, shifting cultivation and logging. The disposal of mine tailings is also having a direct adverse impact on the lake's resources. The existing Philippine crocodile (Crocodylus mindorensis) population in the lake is endangered because of the present intensity of human activities; the major threats to the species are accelerated siltation in the lake, poaching, pesticides pollution and the destruction of the natural vegetation on the lake shore.

References
 Lake Leonard Data

External links
 Geographic data related to Lake Leonard at OpenStreetMap

Dasay
Landforms of Davao de Oro